The Roach River is an  tributary of the North Fork Rivanna River in the U.S. state of Virginia. It is part of the James River watershed.

It rises at Powell Gap in Shenandoah National Park and flows southeast, passing the communities of Bacon Hollow and Dyke. Flowing entirely within Greene County, it joins the Lynch River to form the North Fork of the Rivanna just north of the Albemarle County line.

See also
List of rivers of Virginia

References

USGS Hydrologic Unit Map - State of Virginia (1974)

Rivers of Virginia
Tributaries of the James River
Rivers of Greene County, Virginia
Rivers of Albemarle County, Virginia